Bryanictis ("Bryan's weasel") is an extinct genus of placental mammals from extinct subfamily Didymictinae within extinct family Viverravidae, that lived in North America, from the early to late Paleocene.

Phylogeny
The phylogenetic relationships of genus Bryanictis are shown in the following cladogram:

See also
 Mammal classification
 Didymictinae

References

Paleocene mammals of North America
Viverravids
Prehistoric placental genera